Lee Savold (born Lee Hulver; March 22, 1915 – May 14, 1972) was an American heavyweight boxer who held the British and European (EBU) version of the World Heavyweight championship between 1950 and 1951 and was a leading contender in the 1940s and early 1950s. During his career he fought storied Heavyweight Champions Joe Louis and Rocky Marciano. Savold was inducted into the Minnesota Boxing Hall of Fame in 2012.

Savold has the most fights and wins of any heavyweight champion in boxing history.

Personal life

Savold was born in Canby, Minnesota (his birth was recorded in the nearby town of Marshall). His parents were farmers and ranchers of Norwegian ancestry. In his youth, he broke horses and herded cattle on his family ranch.

At one time or another he was a bouncer, bartender, road laborer, and stockyard worker. In 1943 he joined the merchant marine and took part in several convoys to Murmansk. After retiring from boxing, he worked for Local 825 of the Operating Engineers Union.

Boxing career
On September 16, 1940, Lee Savold KO’d Andy Miler in round 1 (1:43). Jack Dempsey, former heavyweight champion, who was at ringside, presented the Iowa State Heavyweight Championship trophy to Savold after the bout.

On May 25, 1942, he KO'd Lou Nova in the eighth round in a bout which was named The Ring magazine Upset of the Year.

On March 19, 1948, Savold set the record for the quickest knockout in a main event bout at Madison Square Garden by knocking out Italy's Gino Buonvino. He was the underdog, and had been substituted for Joe Baksi, who had injured his ankle, on only 48 hours' notice. The record stood until Gerry Cooney tied the record by KO'ing Ken Norton in 1981. It was finally broken on March 10, 2007, when Sultan Ibragimov KO'd Javier Mora in 46 seconds.

On June 6, 1950, he defeated Bruce Woodcock on a fourth round cut eye stoppage to win the EBU version of the World Heavyweight title, Savold had lost on a foul in their first meeting in 1948.

On June 17, 1951 he fought Joe Louis in what was the first professional prizefight carried to theaters on closed-circuit TV. He was knocked out in 2 minutes 29 seconds of the sixth round. Although it was a non-title match, after this bout the EBU withdrew recognition of Savold as "world" champion.

In his last fight, he lasted 7 rounds before being TKO'd by legendary boxer Rocky Marciano on February 13, 1952.

Death
Savold died on May 14, 1972, aged 57, at the Jersey Shore Medical Center in Neptune City, New Jersey. He had been admitted a month earlier after suffering a stroke in his apartment in Spring Lake, New Jersey.

Professional boxing record
All information in this section is derived from BoxRec, unless otherwise stated.

Official record

All newspaper decisions are officially regarded as “no decision” bouts and are not counted in the win/loss/draw column.

Unofficial record

Record with the inclusion of newspaper decisions in the win/loss/draw column.

References

External links
 

|-

Boxers from Minnesota
Heavyweight boxers
1915 births
1972 deaths
American male boxers